Englewood Township is a township in Clark County, Kansas, USA.  As of the 2000 census, its population was 171.

Geography
According to the USGS, it contains one cemetery, Englewood.

Perry Lake and Proffitt Lake are within this township. The streams of Antelope Creek, East Indian Creek, Fivemile Creek, Gyp Creek, Indian Creek, Johns Creek, Sand Creek, Twomile Creek and West Indian Creek run through this township.

References
 USGS Geographic Names Information System (GNIS)

External links
 US-Counties.com
 City-Data.com

Townships in Clark County, Kansas
Townships in Kansas